The Weather Station (German: Der Wetterwart) is a 1923 German silent film directed by Carl Froelich and starring Mady Christians, Albert Steinrück and Hans Brausewetter.

The film's sets were designed by the art directors Otto Erdmann and Hans Sohnle.

Cast
Mady Christians as lady
Albert Steinrück as weatherman
Hans Brausewetter as son
Julius Falkenstein as baron
Albert Paulig

References

External links

Films of the Weimar Republic
Films directed by Carl Froelich
German silent feature films
German black-and-white films
Films set in the Alps
UFA GmbH films